Neil Murdoch (born 22 November 1972, in Dumfries) is a Scottish curler from nearby Lockerbie. Murdoch is a former European curling champion.

Sporting career

Neil Murdoch won the 2003 European Championships, as second for Scotland skip David Murdoch. Neil played third for Scotland skip Craig Wilson at the 1993 (gold medalist) and 1994 World Juniors. He was also a member of Team Europe at the 2004 Continental Cup in Medicine Hat.

At the 2005 World Championships, Murdoch again played second for his brother David. Team Scotland earned the silver medal, losing to Team Canada in the final.

Personal life

Neil Murdoch is the brother of World Curling Champion David Murdoch and Olympic curling coach Nancy Murdoch. Murdoch is a veterinary surgeon.

References

External links
 

1972 births
Living people
Scottish male curlers
Sportspeople from Dumfries
Continental Cup of Curling participants
European curling champions